'KKY' may refer to

 Kappa Kappa Psi (ΚΚΨ), United States national honorary band fraternity
 Kilkenny Airport, Ireland, IATA airport code KKY
 Kalau Kawau Ya (KKY), one of the western and central Torres Strait languages, see Kala Lagaw Ya
 Ka Kwe Ye, government defence militia in Burma, see Lo Hsing Han
 Library of Congress classification for Ukraine law since 1991, see Library of Congress Classification:Class K -- Law - Europe
 Department of Cybernetics (KKY), a departments of the Faculty of Applied Sciences at the University of West Bohemia in Pilsen, Czech Republic

See also
 Kim Ki-young (1922–1998), South Korean film director